Osibirock is the sixth studio album by British Afro rock band Osibisa released in 1974 by Warner Bros. Records K56048 and WEA International WE 835. Issued in 2000 CD format by One Way Records 35165. The cover depicted Henri Rousseau's "Negro Attacked By a Jaguar".

Track listing
All songs arranged, performed and composed by Osibisa.

Charts

Personnel
Osibisa
 Teddy Osei – tenor and soprano saxophones, flute, percussion, vocals
 Mac Tontoh – trumpet, flugelhorn, percussion
 Sol Amarfio – drums, percussion
 Kofi Ayivor - congas, percussion
 Jean-Karl Dikoto Mandengue – bass guitar, percussion
 Kiki Djan – keyboards, percussion
 Paul Golly – guitar

Production
 Producer – Peter Gallen
 Engineer – Ashley Howe
 Art direction - Ed Thrasher
 Cover co-ordinator – Gail Clark
 Cover concept – Peter Gallen
 Cover painting – “Negro Attacked by a Jaguar” by Henri Rousseau. 
 Photography – Graham Hughes

References

 All information gathered from liner notes of CD Osibirock (Copyright © 1974 Warner Bros. Records K 56048 and WEA International WE 835).
 Allmusic 
 Discogs 

1974 albums
Osibisa albums
Warner Records albums